Arkholme-with-Cawood is a civil parish in Lancaster, Lancashire, England. It contains 30 listed buildings, which are recorded in the National Heritage List for England. Of these, one is listed at Grade II*, the middle grade, and the others are at Grade II.  The parish contains the village of Arkholme, and is otherwise rural.  Most of the listed buildings are houses and cottages in the village, or farmhouses and farm buildings in the surrounding countryside.  The other listed buildings include a church with a cross base in its churchyard, a school, a public house, an animal pound, and a milestone.

Key

Buildings

References

Citations

Sources

Lists of listed buildings in Lancashire
Buildings and structures in the City of Lancaster